George M. Steinbrenner High School is a public high school in Lutz, Florida. It is located adjacent to McKitrick Elementary and Martinez Middle School. The school was named in honor of late New York Yankees owner George Steinbrenner, a Tampa resident.

Steinbrenner opened August 25, 2009, with about 1600 students.

Extracurriculars
Steinbrenner High School offers many extracurricular opportunities. A few of the extracurricular opportunities are orchestra, band, jazz band, and choir.

Athletics
Sports offered at Steinbrenner include:

Football
Flag Football (girls)
Volleyball
Cheerleading
Swimming (boy's and girl's teams)
Cross Country (boy's and girl's teams)
Golf (boy's and girl's teams)
Basketball (boy's and girl's teams)
Soccer (boy's and girl's teams)
Wrestling
Baseball
Softball
Track (boy's and girl's teams)
Tennis (boy's and girl's teams)
Lacrosse (boy's and girl's teams)

In the 2010–2011 season, the girls' soccer team won the class 4A State Championship.

In the 2016 season, the girls cross country team won the 4A State Championship.

In the 2016 season, the baseball team won the class 8A State Championship.

In the 2019 season, the boys cross country team won the 4A State Championship.

Notable alumni

Tobi Antigha (2011) football player.
Kevin Merrell (2014) baseball player.
CJ Van Eyk (2017) baseball player.

References

High schools in Hillsborough County, Florida
Public high schools in Florida
2009 establishments in Florida
Educational institutions established in 2009